This is a list of lighthouses in Benin.

Lighthouses

See also
List of lighthouses in Togo (to the west)
List of lighthouses in Nigeria (to the east)
 Lists of lighthouses and lightvessels

References

External links

Benin
Lighthouses
Lighthouses